Paola Alejandra Díaz (born 18 January 1992) is a Mexican triathlete. She won the silver medal in the women's event at the 2015 Pan American Games.

References

1992 births
Living people
Mexican female triathletes
Sportspeople from Mexico City
Pan American Games silver medalists for Mexico
Triathletes at the 2015 Pan American Games
Pan American Games medalists in triathlon
Medalists at the 2015 Pan American Games